"Deux amis pour un amour" is a song by French singer Johnny Hallyday. It was released as a single and included on his 1970 studio album Vie.

Composition and writing 
The song was written by Roger Dumas et Jean-Jacques Debout. The recording was produced by Lee Hallyday.

Commercial performance 
In France the single spent three weeks at no. 1 on the singles sales chart (in October–November 1970).

Track listing 
7" single Philips 6009 089 (1970, France etc.)
 A. "Deux amis pour un amour" (3:33)
 B. "Rendez-moi le soleil" (3:10)

Charts

References

External links 
 Johnny Hallyday – "Deux amis pour un amour" (single) at Discogs

1970 songs
1970 singles
French songs
Songs about friendship
Johnny Hallyday songs
Philips Records singles
Number-one singles in France
Songs written by Jean-Jacques Debout
Songs written by Roger Dumas
Song recordings produced by Lee Hallyday